Myfanwy Haycock (1913–1963) was a Welsh poet, illustrator, BBC broadcaster, and journalist. She was born Blodwen Myfanwy Haycock  in Pontnewynydd, Wales, near Pontypool, in the traditional county of Monmouthshire, .

Early life and education 
She was the youngest of three daughters born to James David Haycock, a miner and his wife, Alice Maud. She was educated locally at Cwm-ffrwd-oer Primary School and Pontypool Grammar School for Girls, entering Cardiff Technical College.

She worked as a black and white illustrator but had success with her poetry, winning at the Welsh National Eisteddfod in Port Talbot in 1932.

She decided to forsake a career as an art teacher for that of a freelance journalist.

From 1936 she wrote poems and short stories and often illustrated them with woodcuts and black and white illustrations. These were regularly published in the Western Mail newspaper, based in Cardiff, and other South Wales papers. She also submitted work to journals and other publications.

World War II 

During World War II she initially became a wages clerk in a munitions factory at ROF Glascoed between Pontypool and Usk, then Assistant Welfare Officer in a Cardiff barrage balloon factory, a teacher and then an Information Officer at the local agricultural college at Usk.

In 1943 she joined the BBC in London where two of her radio plays were broadcast. She gave regular readings over the airwaves and she entered journalism in 1945, also in London, writing articles for various papers.

She also designed cards, had poems published, illustrated books and became a member of the Society of Women Journalists.

Marriage and family life 

In the summer of 1947 she married Dr. Arthur Meirion Williams of Borth, a hospital Consultant based in Surrey. They lived at Buckland near Reigate, bringing up three children.

Her health gradually deteriorated although she still wrote articles and even read some of her poems on television.

She died in 1963.

Legacy 

She is known for 'Mountain Over Paddington' 1964 and collections of her poetry, 'Poems' 1944 and 'More Poems' 1945.

Her work can be seen on display at Torfaen Museum.

References

External links
 A poem by Myfanwy about Llancayo Mill near Usk

1913 births
1963 deaths
20th-century British journalists
20th-century Welsh women artists
20th-century Welsh poets
20th-century Welsh women writers
Anglo-Welsh women poets
People from Pontypool
Alumni of Cardiff School of Art and Design
Welsh illustrators
British women illustrators
British art teachers
BBC people
Welsh journalists
Welsh women journalists